The Terror is a 1926 American silent Western film directed by Clifford Smith and starring Art Acord. It was produced and distributed by Universal Pictures.

Plot

Cast
 Art Acord - Art Downs
 Velma Connor - Molly Morton
 Dudley Hendricks - Pop Morton
 C. E. Anderson - Blair Hatley
 Edmund Cobb - Jim Hatley
 Jess Deffenbach - Steve
 Hank Bell - Sheriff
 Rex the Dog - Rex
 Raven the Horse - Buddie

Preservation status
 A print is preserved on 16mm.

References

External links
 
 
  lobby poster

1926 films
Universal Pictures films
1926 Western (genre) films
American black-and-white films
Films directed by Clifford Smith
Silent American Western (genre) films
1920s American films
Films with screenplays by Richard Schayer
1920s English-language films